Noraldo Palacios Rivas (born 8 July 1980 in Turbo, Antioquia) is a Colombian javelin thrower. His personal best throw is 79.61 m, achieved in Bogotá 24 May 2009.

He won bronze medals at the 2005 South American Championships and the 2006 Central American and Caribbean Games, and silver medals at the 2002 Central American and Caribbean Games and the 2003 South American Championships.

In 2009 he was found guilty of betamethasone doping. The sample was delivered on 22 May 2008 in an in-of-competition test in São Paulo. He received a suspension from June 2008 to December 2008.

Achievements

References
 

1980 births
Living people
Colombian male javelin throwers
Doping cases in athletics
Colombian sportspeople in doping cases
Athletes (track and field) at the 2003 Pan American Games
Sportspeople from Antioquia Department
Pan American Games competitors for Colombia
Central American and Caribbean Games silver medalists for Colombia
Central American and Caribbean Games bronze medalists for Colombia
Competitors at the 2002 Central American and Caribbean Games
Competitors at the 2006 Central American and Caribbean Games
Central American and Caribbean Games medalists in athletics
21st-century Colombian people